Joseph Huber Sr. (died 1867), was president of the Los Angeles, California, Common Council—the legislative arm of that city—for two years, beginning May 1863 and ending May 1865. He had earlier terms as a member, winning a seat in a special election on January 7, 1861, to replace Damien Marchesseault, who had resigned, and also serving in the 1862–63 term.

References

Further reading

 Obituary in Los Angeles Semi-Weekly News, July 12, 1867, page 3, column 1.

Year of birth missing
1867 deaths
19th-century American politicians
Los Angeles City Council members